Anthony Weston is an American writer, teacher, and philosopher. He is an author of widely used primers in critical thinking and ethical practice and of a variety of unconventional books and essays on philosophical topics.

Life
Weston was born in 1954 and grew up in the Sauk County region of southwestern Wisconsin, country identified with the conservationist Aldo Leopold (in his Sand County Almanac) and the architect and visionary Frank Lloyd Wright, a strong influence on his father's family. He is a 1976 Honors graduate of Macalester College, and received his PhD in Philosophy in 1982 from the University of Michigan, where he wrote his PhD dissertation with Frithjof Bergmann on "The Subjectivity of Values". He taught at the State University of New York at Stony Brook for ten years, and subsequently at Elon University, where he has won the University's premiere awards for both teaching and scholarship, as well as abroad in Costa Rica, Western Australia, and British Columbia.

Weston has worked in philosophy for his entire professional life but teaches and writes on interdisciplinary themes and beyond as well. He has co-taught with biologists and ecologists and in both Philosophy and Environmental Studies at Elon, working as well with astronomers, Zen masters and in environmental education programs as well as on design and social change projects such as Common Ground Eco-Village. Weston retired from full-time teaching in 2018 while continuing to write and to take more leadership roles in the eco-village.

Philosophical work
Weston's philosophical project as a whole advances an expansive "toolbox" for critical, creative, and constructive thinking, especially for purposes of social and environmental re-imagination and pragmatic ethical practice. The social, ethical, even ontological problems that we so often take as "given" are more often, he argues, products of underlying conditions, practices, and choices. This view may be identified with deconstruction, but too often, Weston argues,

 the genuine promise of this critical move is betrayed by the thinnest of follow-ups. We need to give the same kind of attention to the re-construction of genuinely better alternatives in the new space of freedom that broadly deconstructive moves create. ("A 21st Century Philosophical Toolbox", Keynote address for the Atlantic Region Philosophers Association Conference, 10/16/09)

This reconstructive project calls on a set of skills and concepts less often recognized and valued in philosophy. Inspired in particular by the pragmatic social philosophy of John Dewey, Weston envisions open-ended, generative, imaginative and experimental thinking, modeled on crafts such as building or performance and empirical science, gradually displacing more category-bound and formal thinking that tends to be more reactive and critical. In a variety of essays and books he lays out key concepts such as "the hidden possibilities of things" – the sense that the world has much more depth and possibility than it may seem – and correlatively the need to thematize and resist self-validating reduction, the process by which some being or some part of the world are reduced to less than they might be, and then that very reduction is taken as an excuse and validation for itself, the obliterated possibilities now thoroughly out of view. Correspondingly, the task of knowing and valuing is not to "read off" the nature and possibility of things off the world as it is "given", but to actively engage the world, to "venture the trust" to create new kinds of openings in interaction with the world within which deeper possibilities might emerge.

Settled modes of value issue in the familiar ethics, of persons for example, but the "originary" areas of ethics, as Weston calls them, are only now taking shape, and are not a matter of extension or application of pre-given principles but rather the co-creation or co-constitution of new values. In environmental ethics in particular, Weston argues that we stand at the very beginning of our exploration. At the same time, he also argues for a "multicentric" approach to reconstituting the human relation to the more-than-human world, as opposed to the "mono-centrism" that could either be human-centered (anthropocentric) or larger-than-human but still "centered" in the sense that one dimension and model for values determines who or what morally counts and why.

Another key theme is the centrality of the built and lived world to the shaping of thought, as well as vice versa. Philosophers tend to assume a one-way connection—that thought determines world—while philosophy's critics, such as doctrinaire Marxists, see it just the other way around. In Weston's view the connection goes both ways, and is genuinely dialectical. A world or a set of concrete practices represent the enactment of certain ideas, but they also shape our ideas in turn. The cultural enactment and perpetuation of anthropocentrism is one good example. But this is, in his view, a good thing, and a necessary one: it gives thought an anchor, allows us to work out ideas concretely, and gives us a lever for philosophical change as well: by actually changing the world. Once again, the world as it is, is not somehow the limit of possibility.

 The world shapes our concepts but does not determine them; likewise our concepts shape our thought but do not determine it. The upshot is conceptual room to move. Rather than analyzing concepts as if they were fixed read-offs of reality, we can reshape and relocate them, and by so doing remake thought and the world itself. ("A 21st Century Philosophical Toolbox")

Finally, just as ethical practice becomes intelligent, creative, critical engagement with problematic situations and possibilities rather than "puzzle-solving", so even the widely taught and conventional field of critical thinking becomes something more than a matter of testing someone else's arguments for "fallacies", but rather a constructive and open-ended process of framing one's own arguments and energetically recasting and exploring others' lines of thought.

 Philosophy is itself a mode of world-making. We need to embrace philosophy as an experimental and invitational mode of practice in that light.

Weston has called his overall project "Pragmatopian", adapting Charlotte Perkins Gilman's term for the project of her visionary novels: radical but experimental utopias. Philosophy as he tries to practice it, Weston has said, is a kind of "pragmatopian dare".

Writings

Books

Critical and constructive thinking
 A Rulebook for Arguments (Hackett Publishing Company, 1986; 5th edition, 2018) now in its 5th edition and translated into ten languages: this critical-thinking handbook is Weston's best known textbook. 
 A Workbook for Arguments, co-authored with David Morrow (Hackett Publishing Company, 2011). Textbook expansion of Rulebook. Third edition, 2019. 
 Creativity for Critical Thinkers (Oxford University Press, 2007)
 Thinking Through Questions, co-authored with Stephen Bloch-Schulman (Hackett Publishing Company, 2020). Short textbook exploring critical, creative, and philosophical questioning, along with "questionable questions" and the uses of questioning in college classes.

Pedagogy
 Teaching as the Art of Staging: A Scenario-Based College Pedagogy in Action (Stylus Publishing, 2018 ) argues for and illustrates a radically more co-active and "designing" role for teachers than either the information-providing lecturer or the usual facilitator/coach model. "Impresarios with Scenarios" are "teachers who serve as class mobilizers, improvisers, and energizers, staging dramatic, often unexpected and self-unfolding learning challenges and adventures with students".

Ethics
 Toward Better Problems (Temple University Press, 1992), a systematic attempt at Deweyan reconstruction in contemporary ethics.
 A Practical Companion To Ethics (Oxford University Press, 1997; 5th edition, 2020 ). A short guide to "the basic attitudes and skills that make ethics work".
 A 21st Century Ethical Toolbox (Oxford University Press, 2001; 5th edition, forthcoming 2023). A full-scale textbook for ethics in a pragmatic key. 
 Creative Problem-Solving in Ethics (Oxford University Press, 2007)

Environmentalism
 Back to Earth: Tomorrow's Environmentalism (Temple University Press, 1994). An attempt to recover the experience of life among other-than-human beings and within nature that grounds our ethical engagement with them.
 An Invitation to Environmental Philosophy (Oxford University Press, 1999), with essays by David Abram, Val Plumwood, Holmes Rolston III, and Jim Cheney, with Preface and "Going On" sections as well a companion essay by Weston.
 The Incompleat Eco-Philosopher: Essays on the Edges of Environmental Ethics (State University of New York Press, 2009). A collection of some of Weston's key essays in the field from the professional literature.
 Mobilizing the Green Imagination: An Exuberant Manifesto (New Society Publishers, 2012). This is a book of practical but sweeping environmental visions, Weston's "pragmatopian imagination" fully applied, or as the book's cover puts it, "elegant and audacious possibilities that push the boundaries of contemporary environmentalism".

Social philosophy
 Jobs for Philosophers (Xlibris, 2003) appears to be a collection of reviews of (real) adventurous philosophy books and projects, but is in fact a portrait of what philosophy might become. This is a self-published book. 
 How to Re-Imagine the World: A Pocket Handbook for Practical Visionaries (New Society Publishers, 2007)

Selected essays
Weston has written over fifty essays and reviews in the above fields as well as others such as philosophy of education and the philosophy of space exploration. Some of the more noted and often-reprinted of these are (original appearances only):

 "Beyond Intrinsic Value: Pragmatism in Environmental Ethics", Environmental Ethics 7:4 (1985): 321–339. 
 "Forms of Gaian Ethics", Environmental Ethics 9:3 (1987): 121–134. 
 "Radio Astronomy as Epistemology: Some Philosophical Reflections on the Search for Extraterrestrial Intelligence", Monist 71:1 (1988): 88–100.  This is a less surprising theme in Weston's work than it may seem, given his interest in other-than-human "contact" right here on Earth; it also emerges in his recent teaching and in the last chapters of both The Incompleat Ecophilosopher and Mobilizing the Green Imagination.
 "Uncovering the 'Hidden Curriculum': A Laboratory Course in Philosophy of Education", APA Newsletter on Teaching Philosophy 90:2 (Winter 1991): 36–40. 
 "Non-anthropocentrism in a Thoroughly Anthropocentrized World", The Trumpeter 8:3 (1991): 108–112. 
 "Before Environmental Ethics", Environmental Ethics 14 (1992): 323–340 
 "Self-Validating Reduction: Toward a Theory of the Devaluation of Nature", Environmental Ethics 18 (1996): 115–132. 
 "Instead of Environmental Education", in Bob Jickling, ed., Proceedings of the Yukon College Symposium on Ethics, Environment, and Education (Whitehorse, Y.T.: Yukon College, 1996).
  "Risking Philosophy of Education", Metaphilosophy 29 (1998): 145–158. 
 "Environmental Ethics as Environmental Etiquette: Toward an Ethics-Based Epistemology in Environmental Philosophy" (with Jim Cheney), Environmental Ethics 21 (1999): 115–134. 
 "Multi-Centrism: A Manifesto", Environmental Ethics 26 (2004): 25–40. 
 "For a Meta-Ethics as Good as Our Practice", in Elizabeth Burge, editor, "Negotiating Dilemmas of Practice: Applied Ethics in Adult Education", special issue of New Directions in Adult and Continuing Education (Jossey-Bass, 2009). 
 "From Guide on the Side to Impresario with a Scenario", College Teaching 63:3 (2015)  Proposes a new model of the college teacher in contrast to the traditional lecturer ("Sage on the Stage") or facilitator/coach ("Guide on the Side").

Criticism
Critics argue that Weston's notions of "originary ethics" and "reconstructive engagement" offer little or no concrete guidance, especially in less-than-optimal situations in which choices nonetheless must be made. Though Weston has challenged what he has called "dilemma-ism" as a method of doing ethics or as an expectation about the necessary structure of ethical problems, sometimes we do have genuine dilemmas that need to be addressed. Some critics hold that Weston's commitment to opening up new possibilities may open up a range of problematic and possibly disturbing possibilities as well.

Weston's ethics textbooks in particular take substantive positions in ethical philosophy. Weston's rationale is that any practical textbook necessarily does so, and that this  is just less noticeable or objectionable to traditionalists in the usual textbooks because the substance tends to be the taken-for-granted norms. Weston's method is to try to reconstruct certain fields the long way around: by rewriting their textbooks, modeling a quite different approach in practice and therefore inviting new kinds of students into the field and perhaps also reshaping their teachers' views without arguing in the usual way against the assumed norms.

See also
Self-validating reduction
List of American philosophers
List of environmental philosophers

References

External links
Elon University Philosophy faculty page
Mobilizing the Green Imagination book website

1954 births
20th-century American male writers
20th-century American non-fiction writers
20th-century American philosophers
20th-century essayists
20th-century American mathematicians
21st-century American male writers
21st-century American non-fiction writers
21st-century American philosophers
21st-century essayists
21st-century American  mathematicians
American ethicists
American logicians
American male essayists
American male non-fiction writers
Analytic philosophers
Critical thinking
Elon University faculty
Environmental philosophers
Environmental writers
Epistemologists
Living people
Macalester College alumni
Mathematicians from North Carolina
Metaphysicians
Ontologists
People from Spring Green, Wisconsin
Philosophers of culture
Philosophers of education
Philosophers of logic
Philosophers of mathematics
Philosophers of mind
Philosophy academics
Philosophy writers
Pragmatists
American social commentators
Social philosophers
Sustainability advocates
University of Michigan alumni
Writers from Durham, North Carolina
Writers from Wisconsin